Flatlinerz is a hip hop group from Brooklyn, New York. The group was one of the early acts involved in the horrorcore genre of Hip-Hop, along with The Gravediggaz.

Albums

Studio

Compilations

EPs

References

Hip hop discographies
Discography